Still, Nothing Moves You is the second full-length album from the American hardcore punk band Ceremony. It was released in August 2008 through Bridge 9 Records.

Reception

Ceremony's sophomore full-length release was received by generally favorable reviews, following high expectations set by their widely acclaimed initial releases. Critics also acknowledged the record's slight departure from the intensity of Violence Violence for a sound that was increasingly influenced by 1980s hardcore punk.

Punknews.org notes that "Ceremony have further abandoned the fuck-all, one-after-another power-violence attacks to better vary their approach, nonetheless one still indebted to rabid mid-`80s hardcore". Similarly, Sputnikmusic writes that, in comparison to Ceremony's previous releases, the songs in Still Nothing Moves You "are less spontaneous 30 second bursts of violence, and more well thought out 56 second bursts of aggression".

Track listing

Personnel
Ross Farrar – vocals
Anthony Anzaldo – guitars
Ryan Mattos – guitars
Justin Davis – bass
Jake Casarotti – drums

Technical personnel
Dan Rathbun – producer
Adam Rossiter – artwork

References

External links

2008 albums
Bridge 9 Records albums
Ceremony (punk band) albums